Jamno  is a lake in northern Poland (in West Pomeranian Voivodeship), close to the Baltic Sea. It is divided from the sea by a spit, on which lie the resorts of Mielno and Unieście.

The lake is popularly used for sailing.

An examination of this lake from 2007 shows it is a brackish coastal lagoon that at that time was heavily polluted by sewage from the nearby city of Koszalin.

References

Lakes of Poland
Lakes of West Pomeranian Voivodeship